David Tomassini (born 14 March 2000) is a Sammarinese footballer who plays as a forward for La Fiorita and the San Marino national team.

International career
Tomassini made his international debut for San Marino on 31 March 2021 in a 2022 FIFA World Cup qualification match against Albania. On 1 June 2021, he scored San Marino's first goal in over 1 year against Kosovo in a friendly in the 85th minute.

International goals
Scores and results list San Marino's goal tally first.

International career statistics

References

External links
 
 
 
 

2000 births
Living people
Sammarinese footballers
San Marino youth international footballers
San Marino under-21 international footballers
San Marino international footballers
Sammarinese expatriate footballers
Sammarinese expatriate sportspeople in Italy
Expatriate footballers in Italy
Association football forwards
A.S.D. Victor San Marino players
S.S. Murata players